Anees Ibrahim Kaskar is a Mumbai based Indian gangster, criminal mobster and drug dealer. He is wanted by the Mumbai police in connection with more than 24 cases of murder, extortion and drug smuggling.

Personal life
Anees Ibrahim is the son of a former Criminal Investigation Department's havaldar, Ibrahim Kaskar. He is the brother of Dawood Ibrahim.

References

See also

 1993 Bombay bombings
 Organised crime in India

Indian crime bosses
D-Company
1993 Bombay bombings
Indian expatriates in Pakistan
Confidence tricksters
Konkani Muslims
Indian Sunni Muslims
Living people
Businesspeople from Mumbai
Organised crime in Pakistan
Indian smugglers
Year of birth missing (living people)